Igor Sokolov (born 1954) is a Russian scientist, Dr. Sc., Professor, Academician of the Russian Academy of Sciences professor at the MSU CMC and Moscow Technological University (MIREA), director of the Institute for Informatics Problems. Acting Dean of the Faculty of Computational Mathematics and Cybernetics at Moscow State University (MSU CMC).

Biography 
He graduated from the faculty MSU CMC (1976).

He defended the thesis «Basics of construction of large-scale telecommunication systems of dual application» for the degree of Doctor of Technical Sciences (1998).

Was awarded the title of Corresponding Member of the Russian Academy of Sciences (2003), Academician of the Russian Academy of Sciences (2008).

Author of 3 books and more than 30 scientific articles.

Area of scientific interests: information technology, modeling of information flows in financial applications, development of applied mathematical methods, methods of monitoring communication networks.

References

External links
 Russian Academy of Sciences
 MSU CMC
 Scientific works of Igor Sokolov
 Scientific works of Igor Sokolov

Russian computer scientists
1954 births
Living people
Full Members of the Russian Academy of Sciences
Academic staff of Moscow State University
Moscow State University alumni